The 1956–57 North Carolina Tar Heels men's basketball team was the  varsity college basketball team that represented the University of North Carolina. The head coach was Frank McGuire. The team played its home games at Woollen Gymnasium in Chapel Hill, North Carolina, and was a member of the Atlantic Coast Conference.  The team was the second undefeated national champion in NCAA basketball history and was the first ACC team to win a title. The team notably won its last two games in triple overtime. The Tar Heels leading scorer was player of the year, small forward Lennie Rosenbluth.

In the semifinal against Jumping Johnny Green and Michigan State, to tie the game in regulation, Pete Brennan, usually the power forward, after gathering the rebound, ran the floor like a guard and put in a jump shot with a soft touch. Three overtimes later, UNC won 74 to 70.

This placed undefeated North Carolina for the championship against Wilt Chamberlain and Kansas. Again the game went to triple overtime. Center Joe Quigg made the winning free throws.

Roster

Schedule

|+Schedule
|-
!colspan=9 style="background:#56A0D3; color:#FFFFFF;"| Regular season

|-
!colspan=8 style="background:#56A0D3; color:#FFFFFF;"| ACC tournament

|-
!colspan=8 style="background:#56A0D3; color:#FFFFFF;"| NCAA tournament

Season summary
Hired away  from St. John’s in 1952 to make North Carolina basketball competitive with rival NC State, legendary coach Frank McGuire mined his native New York for talent and put together a team that won the national championship by slowing down dominating Kansas center Wilt Chamberlain. A veteran lineup led by star forward Lennie Rosenbluth, who averaged 28 points, finished the season a perfect 32-0.

Rankings

Awards and honors
 Lennie Rosenbluth, Helms Foundation Player of the Year
 Lennie Rosenbluth, ACC Player of the Year
 Lennie Rosenbluth, 1st Team All-ACC
 Frank McGuire, UPI National Coach of the Year
 Frank McGuire, ACC Coach of the Year
 Tommy Kearns, 1st Team All-ACC
 Pete Brennan, 2nd Team All-ACC

References

Footnotes

Citations

Bibliography

NCAA Division I men's basketball tournament championship seasons
North Carolina Tar Heels men's basketball seasons
North Carolina
NCAA Division I men's basketball tournament Final Four seasons
North Carolina
Tar
Tar